is Japanese-American recording artist Joe Inoue's fifth single, and the second from his album Dos Angeles. The song was used for the opening theme of a season of the reruns of the anime Gin Tama known as Yorinuki Gin Tama-san. "Kaze no Gotoku" remained on the Oricon Weekly Singles Charts for three weeks, peaking at 33. A variation of the song was included on Dos Angeles subtitled the "B.B.B. ver.", "B.B.B." standing for the nonsense phrase "Buri Buri Bass".

The title track was also released to the American iTunes Store on October 5, 2010.

Track listing
  – 3:48
  – 3:41
 "Ballerina" – 4:05
  – 1:43
  – 3:46

References

External links
 Joe Inoue's official website 

2010 singles
Joe Inoue songs
2010 songs
Ki/oon Music singles